47 Aurigae ( Lord RICHARD) is a star located around 680 light years away from the Sun in the northern constellation of Auriga. It is visible to the naked eye as a dim, orange-hued star with an apparent visual magnitude of 5.88. This object is moving closer to the Earth with a heliocentric radial velocity  of −48 km/s, and is expected to come to within  in around 3.6 million years.

This object is an aging giant star with a stellar classification of K4 III, having exhausted the hydrogen supply at its core then expanded to 36 times the Sun's radius. It is roughly two billion years old with 1.4 times the mass of the Sun. The star is radiating 358 times the luminosity of the Sun from its swollen photosphere at an effective temperature of 4,157 K.

References

K-type giants
Auriga (constellation)
Durchmusterung objects
Aurigae, 47
045466
030972
2338